Frauensee is a lake in the Reutte District of Tyrol, Austria. The lake is in the Lechaschau municipality at the eastern foot of Gehrenspitze in the Tannheim Mountains. In the summer it reaches an average temperature of 19°C and is used for bathing.

References

Lakes of Tyrol (state)
Reutte District